Middle Bulgarian language (Bulgarian: средно български) was the lingua franca and the most widely spoken language of the Second Bulgarian Empire. Being descended from Old Bulgarian, Middle Bulgarian eventually developed into modern Bulgarian language by the 16th century.

History 
The use of  Middle Bulgarian starts from the end of the 12th century and continues to the 17th century. This period of the language exhibits significantly different morphology from earlier periods, most notably in the complete disappearance of the locative, instrumental, and genitive cases. Analytical tools for the gradation of adjectives and adverbs appear. In most dialects ъi  transformed to и, but ъi continued to be used in monumental inscriptions.

Features 
In the Middle Bulgarian language there is an increased use of prepositions in the place of the dative, genitive and instrumental cases. There are instances of the genitive being replaced by the preposition от, and of the dative being replaced by various prepositional constructions.

References